Pranamam is a 1986 Indian Malayalam film, directed by Bharathan and produced by Joy Thomas. The film stars Mammootty, Suhasini Mani Ratnam, Nedumudi Venu and Ashokan. The film handles a socially relevant theme and has musical score by Ouseppachan. This movie was remade in Tamil as Puyal Paadum Paattu

Plot
Usha (Suhasini) is a journalist. She decides to write an article on drug abuse by college students and does a photo feature on the issue. The article gets published and the students who appeared in the photos are suspended from their college. One of them,  Georgekutty attempts suicide in shame and gets admitted in the hospital. The college students go into a rebellion against the newspaper and create a lot of problems, which are solved temporarily by a tactful police officer, Prathapan (Mammootty).

A gang of 4 students lead by Damu (Ashokan) and Appukkuttan (Vineeth) kidnaps Usha, locks her up inside Damu's banglow, harasses and injects her with drugs. Usha later saves the boys when a fire breaks out at the banglow. The gang takes care of her when she falls ill. Usha get to know the family background of each member of the gang. All except for Damu are from financially struggling families. Damu is from a rich,  but dysfunctional family with his mother incarcerated in a mental asylum. Damu attempts suicide on his birthday,  but is saved by his friends and Usha.

Prathapan visit the banglow searching for Usha. He beats up the boys during interrogation when Usha comes out defending the boys. Prathapan,  a family friend of Usha is visibly seen close to Usha. Prathapan settles the issue and depart in friendly terms. They all together visit Usha's house  where marriage is fixed between Usha and Prathapan.

Meanwhile, George Kutty dies. And an angry mob who sees Usha during the funeral procession attacks her and beats her to death during the clash.

Cast
 Mammootty as DSP Minnal Prathapan
Suhasini Mani Ratnam as Usha Warrier
Ashokan as Damu
Vineeth as Appukuttan
Nedumudi Venu as Warrier
Babu Antony as Ajith
Prathapachandran as Chackochan
K.P.A.C. Lalitha as Appukkuttan's sister
Achankunju as Chandran's father
Thodupuzha Vasanthi
 Valsala Menon as Damu's mother

Soundtrack
The music was composed by Ouseppachan, with lyrics by Bharathan.

The song "Thaalam Maranna Tharattu" is set in Bharathan's favourite raagam, Hindolam.

References

External links
 

1986 films
1980s Malayalam-language films
Films directed by Bharathan
Films scored by Ouseppachan